Hudson is a city in Stafford County, Kansas, United States.  As of the 2020 census, the population of the city was 95.

History
Hudson was originally called Rattlesnake, and under the latter name was founded in the early 1880s. It was renamed Hudson about 1887. Hudson was incorporated as a city in 1908.

Geography
Hudson is located at  (38.103897, -98.660474).

Demographics

2010 census
As of the census of 2010, there were 129 people, 58 households, and 35 families residing in the city. The racial makeup of the city was 100.0% White. Hispanic or Latino of any race were 4.7% of the population.

There were 58 households, of which 22.4% had children under the age of 18 living with them, 48.3% were married couples living together, 3.4% had a female householder with no husband present, 8.6% had a male householder with no wife present, and 39.7% were non-families. 37.9% of all households were made up of individuals, and 13.8% had someone living alone who was 65 years of age or older. The average household size was 2.22 and the average family size was 2.80.

The median age in the city was 48.5 years. 23.3% of residents were under the age of 18; 2.3% were between the ages of 18 and 24; 14% were from 25 to 44; 39.6% were from 45 to 64; and 20.9% were 65 years of age or older. The gender makeup of the city was 52.7% male and 47.3% female.

2000 census
As of the census of 2000, there were 133 people, 59 households, and 41 families residing in the city. The racial makeup of the city was 97.74% White, and 2.26% from two or more races. Hispanic or Latino of any race were 1.50% of the population.

There were 59 households, out of which 25.4% had children under the age of 18 living with them, 64.4% were married couples living together, 5.1% had a female householder with no husband present, and 30.5% were non-families. 28.8% of all households were made up of individuals, and 10.2% had someone living alone who was 65 years of age or older. The average household size was 2.25 and the average family size was 2.76.

In the city, the population was spread out, with 23.3% under the age of 18, 4.5% from 18 to 24, 27.1% from 25 to 44, 22.6% from 45 to 64, and 22.6% who were 65 years of age or older. The median age was 42 years. For every 100 females, there were 107.8 males. For every 100 females age 18 and over, there were 104.0 males.

The median income for a household in the city was $31,500, and the median income for a family was $36,875. Males had a median income of $28,750 versus $23,750 for females. The per capita income for the city was $13,730. There were 10.3% of families and 16.4% of the population living below the poverty line, including 17.5% of under eighteens and 8.3% of those over 64.

Economy
Stafford County Flour Mills is the primary employer of the community.  In addition to making their own brand of Hudson Cream Flour, they also produce some varieties of flour for Kemach, King Arthur, Kroger brands too.  Their Hudson Cream Flour is very popular in West Virginia and nearby Appalachia regions, for example, it is a required biscuit ingredient for the Hudson Cream West Virginia Biscuit Bake Off contest in Marlinton, West Virginia.

Education
The community is served by St. John-Hudson USD 350 public school district.

See also
 Quivira National Wildlife Refuge

References

Further reading

External links
 Hudson - Directory of Public Officials
 Hudson city map, KDOT

Cities in Kansas
Cities in Stafford County, Kansas